The 2013 BSWW Mundialito was a beach soccer tournament that took place at Praia de Canide Norte in Vila Nova de Gaia, Portugal, from 26 July to 28 July 2013. This competition with 4 teams was played in a round-robin format.

Participating nations

 (host)

Final standings

Schedule and results

Winners

Awards

Top scorers

5 goals
 Llorenç
 Nuno Belchior
3 goals
 S. Yamauchi
 D. Ramacciotti
2 goals
 Pajón
 J. Santos
 Alan Cavalcanti
 J. Maria
 G. Soria
 Matsou

1 goals
 Sidi
 R. Mérida
 Cintas
 B. Novo
 M. Torres
 S. Spada
 F. Corosiniti
 Ozu
 T. Kawaharazuka

See also
Beach soccer
BSWW Mundialito
Euro Beach Soccer League

References

External links
Beach Soccer Worldwide

BSWW Mundialito
BSW
2013 in beach soccer